Gergő is a given name. Notable people with the name include:

Gergő Beliczky (born 1990), Hungarian professional footballer
Gergő Gengeliczki (born 1993), Hungarian football player
Gergő Gőcze (born 1990), Hungarian football player
Gergő Gohér (born 1987), Hungarian footballer
Gergő Iváncsik (born 1981), Hungarian handballer
Gergő Jeremiás (born 1985), Hungarian football player
Gergő Kis (born 1988), Hungarian freestyle swimmer
Gergő Kocsis (born 1994), Hungarian football player
Gergő Kovács (born 1989), Hungarian defender
Gergő Lovrencsics (born 1988), Hungarian professional footballer
Gergő Máté (born 1990), Hungarian football player
Gergő Menyhért (born 1989), Hungarian football player
Gergő Nagy (footballer) (born 1993), Hungarian football player
Gergő Nagy (ice hockey) (born 1989), Hungarian professional ice hockey player
Gergő Németh, Hungarian canoeist who has been competing since the late 2000s
Gergő Oláh (footballer) (born 1989), Hungarian football defender player
Gergő Oláh (singer) (born 1988), Hungarian singer and countertenor, X-Faktor winner
Gergő Rása (born 1989), Hungarian professional footballer
Gergő Vaszicsku (born 1991), Hungarian professional footballer
Gergõ Wöller (born 1983), amateur Hungarian freestyle wrestler
Gergő Zalánki (born 1995), water polo player of Hungary

See also
Georgio (disambiguation)

Hungarian masculine given names